Gardner Memorial Wayside Park is a small public recreation area located on Route 4A in Wilmot, New Hampshire. It is part of  Gile State Forest. The park offers picnicking, a half-mile hiking trail to scenic Butterfield Pond, and fishing on a brook where a mill stood in the 1800s. A park memorial is dedicated to Walter C. Gardner II, whose father established Gile State Forest.

References

External links
Gardner Memorial Wayside Park  New Hampshire Department of Natural and Cultural Resources

State parks of New Hampshire
Parks in Merrimack County, New Hampshire
Wilmot, New Hampshire
Protected areas established in 1980
1980 establishments in New Hampshire